Pultenaea fasciculata, commonly known as alpine bush-pea or bundled bush-pea is a species of flowering plant in the family Fabaceae and is endemic to south-eastern Australia. It is a small prostrate or low-lying shrub with cylindrical leaves and yellow to orange-coloured flowers arranged singly or in small groups near the ends of branchlets.

Description

Taxonomy and naming
Pultenaea fasciculata was first formally described in 1837 by George Bentham in his Commentationes de Leguminosarum Generibus. The specific epithet (fasciculata) means "clustered", referring to the leaves.

Distribution and habitat
Alpine bush-pea grows in alpine or sub-alpine grassland in New South Wales, south from Barrington Tops, in north-eastern Victoria and on the Central Plateau in Tasmania.

References

fasciculata
Flora of New South Wales
Flora of Victoria (Australia)
Flora of Tasmania
Plants described in 1837
Taxa named by George Bentham